Serigne Fallou Niang (born 1 May 1995) is a Senegalese professional footballer who plays as a midfielder for Championnat National 2 club Hyères.

Club career
A youth of Eupen from the Aspire Academy, Niang thereafter moved to the Tunisian club CS Sfaxien.

Niang joined Châteauroux from CS Sfaxien on 3 August 2017, signing a three-year contract. He made his professional debut for Châteauroux in a 1–0 Ligue 2 win over Nîmes on 21 August 2017.

International career
Niang represented the Senegal U20s at the 2015 FIFA U-20 World Cup.

References

External links
 
 

1995 births
Living people
Association football midfielders
Senegalese footballers
Senegal youth international footballers
Aspire Academy (Senegal) players
CS Sfaxien players
LB Châteauroux players
Le Puy Foot 43 Auvergne players
Hyères FC players
Tunisian Ligue Professionnelle 1 players
Ligue 2 players
Championnat National players
Championnat National 3 players
Senegalese expatriate footballers
Expatriate footballers in France
Expatriate footballers in Tunisia
Senegalese expatriate sportspeople in France
Senegalese expatriate sportspeople in Tunisia